John Flannagan (1852 – date of death missing) was a United States Navy sailor and a recipient of the United States military's highest decoration, the Medal of Honor.

Biography
Born in 1852 in Ireland, Flannagan immigrated to the United States and joined the Navy from New York. On that day, while Supply was off the coast of Le Havre, France, he rescued Seaman David Walsh from drowning. For this action, he was awarded the Medal of Honor.

Flannagan's official Medal of Honor citation reads:
Serving on board the U.S.S. Supply, Flannagan rescued from drowning David Walsh, seaman, off Le Havre, France, 26 October 1878.

See also

List of Medal of Honor recipients during peacetime

References

External links

1852 births
19th-century Irish people
Year of death missing
Irish emigrants to the United States (before 1923)
United States Navy sailors
United States Navy Medal of Honor recipients
Irish-born Medal of Honor recipients
Irish sailors in the United States Navy
Non-combat recipients of the Medal of Honor